John Farley is the name of:

John H. Farley (1846–1922), Mayor of Cleveland, Ohio
John Murphy Farley (1842–1918), Irish-American cardinal, seventh bishop (fourth archbishop) of the Roman Catholic diocese of New York
John Farley (pilot) (1933–2018), British test pilot
John Farley (actor) (born 1968), American actor and comedian
John Wells Farley (1878–1959), American football player and coach, head football coach at the University of Maine and Harvard University
John W. Farley, American physicist at the University of Nevada, Las Vegas
John J. Farley III, judge of the United States Court of Appeals
John Farley (footballer) (born 1951), English Footballer for Watford, Halifax Town, Wolverhampton Wanderers, Blackpool, Hull City, and Bury
John Farley (MP) for Gloucester

See also
John Farley Leith (1808–1887), MP for Aberdeen
John Farleigh (1900–1965), English engraver and illustrator